An Unwelcome Guest is a 2009 concept album by the hip hop artists Guante and Big Cats!. The album relates social and political issues such as immigration, conspiracy and violence in a zombie apocalypse narrative.

Track listing

References

2009 albums
Hip hop albums by American artists
Concept albums